Dorothy is an American television sitcom that aired on CBS on Wednesday nights from August 8, 1979 to August 29, 1979.

Summary
Dorothy Banks is a divorced former showgirl who becomes a music and drama teacher at the exclusive Hannah Hunt School for Girls.  The series bore some similarities to The Facts of Life, a much-longer-running sitcom that also premiered in August of 1979 and also involved a central female character who worked at an all-girls school.

Cast
Dorothy Loudon as Dorothy Banks
Kip Gilman as T. Jack Landis
Elissa Leeds as Cissy
Linda Manz as Frankie
Susan Brecht as Meredith
Michele Greene as Margo
Priscilla Morrill as Lorna Cathcart
Russell Nype as Burton Foley

Episodes

References

External links
 

1979 American television series debuts
1979 American television series endings
1970s American sitcoms
CBS original programming
Television shows set in Connecticut